Ronald Joseph Cicenia (December 11, 1935 – January 16, 2007), known as Ron Carey, was an American film and television actor. The  actor was best known for playing ambitious NYPD Police Officer Carl Levitt on TV's Barney Miller, in which he was almost always surrounded by male actors (and sometimes female guest stars) who stood at least  taller. Carey appeared in the recurring role for the last six of the eight seasons of Barney Millers run. He first appeared on the show as a criminal, Angelo Molinari (aka The Mole), in Season 2, Episode 22.

Carey was among the slate of actors who were members of  Mel Brooks unofficial repertory company, appearing in several of the director's films; Carey was featured in Silent Movie, High Anxiety, and History of the World: Part I.  He also appeared in Fatso, directed by Brooks' wife Anne Bancroft and featuring several Brooks regulars.

Life and career
Carey was born in Newark, New Jersey, the son of Fanny and John Cicenia, and was raised in an Italian American Catholic family. He attended Barringer High School, where he was class president in his senior year. Carey did stand-up comedy in the 1960s, after earning a bachelor's degree in communications from Seton Hall University in 1956. His comedy centered mostly on Catholicism and his childhood of being the undersized but quick-witted kid on the block. His break came in 1966 when he appeared on The Merv Griffin Show and in 1967 he released a comedy album entitled The Slightly Irreverent Comedy of Ron Carey.

From the mid-1970s on, Carey was a member of Mel Brooks' comedy troupe, appearing in featured roles in films such as High Anxiety, Silent Movie, and History of the World, Part I. He also appeared in supporting roles in other films and on television, and was seen in scores of commercials, including some T-shirt ads for Hanes, an ad for Nabisco's snack cracker Better Cheddars, where he sang, and a Post Honeycomb ad, in which he played a character named Mr. Big who came to the Honeycomb Hideout looking for a cereal with "a big, big bite." He is most remembered for his role as the diligent but somewhat obsequious and passive-aggressive Officer Carl Levitt, which he played from 1976 to 1982 on the TV series Barney Miller.

Carey died of a stroke at a Cedars-Sinai Medical Center in Los Angeles, California, in January 2007. He is survived by his wife of 38 years, Sharon, and his brother, James Cicenia.

Filmography

References

External links

New York Times obituary
Playbill.com obituary
The Final Taxi podcast on Ron Carey's life

1935 births
2007 deaths
Barringer High School alumni
Male actors from Newark, New Jersey
American people of Italian descent
American stand-up comedians
Seton Hall University alumni
20th-century American male actors
American male film actors
American male television actors
20th-century American comedians
21st-century American comedians